
The following is a list of Playboy Playmates of 1958.  Playboy magazine names its Playmate of the Month each month throughout the year.

January

Elizabeth Ann Roberts (born August 4, 1941) is an American model. She was Playboy magazine's Playmate of the Month for the January 1958 issue. Her centerfold was photographed by Arthur James and Mike Shea, when she was 16.

February

Cheryl Kubert (March 11, 1938 – May 28, 1988) was an American model. She had a bit part in the 1957 film Pal Joey, and was Playboy magazine's Playmate of the Month for the February 1958 issue. Her centerfold was photographed by Mario Casilli. She died at the age of 50, an apparent suicide.

March

Zahra Norbo (born February 7, 1934) is a Swedish model. She was Playboy magazine's Playmate of the Month for the March 1958 issue. Her centerfold was photographed by Tom Caffrey. Norbo was Miss Sweden 1956 and a popular pin-up model in men's magazines.

April

Felicia Atkins (born April 5, 1937) is an Australian model. She was Playboy magazine's Playmate of the Month for the April 1958 issue. Her centerfold was photographed by Bruno Bernard and Bill Bridges.

May

Lari Laine, a pseudonym used by Corrine Cole (born April 13, 1937), is an American model and actress She was Playboy magazine's Playmate of the Month for the May 1958 issue. Her centerfold was photographed by Ron Vogel.

June

Judy Lee Tomerlin (June 18, 1939 – May 24, 2008) is an American model.  She is best known for being Playboy magazine's Playmate of the Month for its June 1958 issue. Her centerfold was photographed by Edward Oppman.

July

Linné Nanette Ahlstrand (July 1, 1936 – January 18, 1967) was an American model and actress.  She was Playboy magazine's Playmate of the Month for its July 1958 issue. Her centerfold was photographed by Frank Bez.

August

Myrna Weber (born April 22, 1938) is an American model.  She is Playboy magazine's Playmate of the Month for its August 1958 issue. Her centerfold was photographed by Bunny Yeager.

September

Teri Hope (born Natalie Hope Ronson; February 15, 1939) is an American model and actress She was Playboy magazine's Playmate of the Month for the September 1958 issue. Her centerfold was photographed by Don Bronstein and Mike Shea.

October

Mara Corday (born Marilyn Joan Watts; January 3, 1930) and Patricia Ann Sheehan, also known as Patricia Sheehan Crosby (September 7, 1931 – January 14, 2006) were the Playboy Playmates of the Month for October 1958.

November

Joan Staley (born Joan Lynette McConchie; May 20, 1940 – November 24, 2019) was an American actress and model.  She is perhaps best known for being Playboy magazine's Playmate of the Month for its November 1958 issue. Her centerfold was photographed by Lawrence Schiller and Ron Vogel. According to The Playmate Book, she was pregnant at the time of her Playmate shoot.

December

Joyce Nizzari (born May 20, 1940) is an American model, dancer, and actress.  She was Playboy magazine's Playmate of the Month for its December 1958 issue and later named both the 5-year Anniversary Playmate and Playmate of the Year for 1959. Her centerfold was photographed by Bunny Yeager.

References

1958-related lists
Playmates Of 1958